Chottanikkara is a town and southern suburb of the city of Kochi, Kerala, India. In local administration, it is a panchayat which consists of Chottanikkara, Kanayannur, Eruvely, Kureekkad, Vattukkunnu, Palace Square and Kottayathupara villages. Chottanikkara is also a part of urban agglomeration of City of Kochi.

The famous Chottanikkara temple is situated in town.  Kochi city buses are directly connected to Chottanikkara. Chottanikkara Government School stadium is one of the largest stadiums in the Ernakulam District. Chottanikkara panchayats were selected as one of the best gram panchayat in the state by the Union Panchayati Raj Ministry.

Location

References

Suburbs of Kochi
Cities and towns in Ernakulam district